Levomoramide is the inactive isomer of the opioid analgesic dextromoramide, invented by the chemist Paul Janssen in 1956. Unlike dextromoramide, which is a potent analgesic with high abuse potential, levomoramide is virtually without activity.

"Resolution reveals that the analgetic activity in this case resides almost entirely in the (+) isomer."

"In the α-CH3 series, one of the optical isomers of each enantiomorphic pair is about twice as active as the racemic mixture; the other isomer is devoid of significant analgesic activity."

However, despite being inactive, levomoramide is scheduled by UN Single Convention on Narcotic Drugs.

References

Synthetic opioids
4-Morpholinyl compunds
Pyrrolidines
Carboxamides

pl:Moramid